Devicharan Barua Girls' College, also known as D.C.B. Girls' College, established in 1955, is a women's college in Jorhat, Assam. This college is affiliated with the Dibrugarh University.

Departments

Arts 
 Assamese
 Bengali
Economics
Education
 English
Geography
History
Logic and Philosophy
Political Science

Science 
Physics
Chemistry
Zoology
Botany
Mathematics

References

External links
Official website

Universities and colleges in Assam
Colleges affiliated to Dibrugarh University
Educational institutions established in 1955
1955 establishments in Assam